The following is a list of events relating to television in Ireland from 2002.

Events

January
14 January – The drama series No Tears debuts on RTÉ Television.
22 January – Following a deal with ITV Digital, UTV2 closes and is replaced by ITV2.
March – Give Up Yer Aul Sins, an animated film produced for RTÉ Television by Brown Bag Films, is nominated for an Academy Award for Best Animated Short Film.

February
No events

March
4 March – The long running Nickelodeon animated series SpongeBob SquarePants begins airing on Irish television for the first time on TG4.

April
No events

May
No events

June
6 June – Dermot Ahern is appointed Minister for Department of Communications, Marine and Natural Resources, with responsibility for broadcasting, responsibility for broadcasting having been transferred to this Department from the Department of Arts, Heritage, Gaeltacht and the Islands.

July
No events

August
29 August – Report of the Forum on Broadcasting submitted to government.

September
No events

October
27 October – You're a Star debuts on RTÉ Television. The programme is a text voting talent show to select Ireland's entry for that year's Eurovision Song Contest.

November
No events

December
1 December – The Commission for Communications Regulation replaces the Office of the Director of Telecommunications Regulations as the overseer of media regulations in the Irish Republic.
27 December – BBC One Northern Ireland airs the 50th episode of its satirical comedy Give My Head Peace, which was filmed in Dublin.
December – The television licence fee increases by €43, while the black-and-white licence fee abolished. The government establishes a mechanism to seek an annual increase in the fee, with a five-year review. There is also a commitment to introduce proposals for a commercial television licence fee.
Undated – RTÉ Television and RTÉ Radio airs coverage of a Forum on Broadcasting being held at the Royal Hospital, Kilmainham in Dublin.
2002–2003 – RTÉ increases its international news coverage with reporters based in Baghdad, northern Iraq, Kuwait, Jordan and Jerusalem, as well as Washington and London correspondents.
2002–2005 – The RTÉ Strategic Plan is introduced.

Debuts

RTÉ
14 January – No Tears (2002)
9 February –  Hoze Houndz on RTÉ Two (1999–2003)
18 February -  24 on RTE Two (2001–2010)
12 March –  Pecola on RTÉ Two (2001–2002)
15 March –  Sheep in the Big City on RTÉ Two (2000–2002)
March –  Code Name: Eternity on RTÉ Two (2000)
1 April - Medabots on RTÉ Two (2000–2001)
11 April –  Merlin the Magical Puppy on RTÉ Two (2001–2002)
24 April –  Adventures of Papyrus on RTÉ Two (1998)
9 September –  The Adventures of Jimmy Neutron: Boy Genius on RTÉ Two (2002–2006)
10 September –  Tracey McBean on RTÉ Two (2002–2006)
10 September –  Funny Little Bugs on RTÉ Two (2001)
11 September –  Totally Spies! on RTÉ Two (2001–2013)
11 September –  Binka on RTÉ Two (2001–2005)
11 September –  Alias on RTÉ Two (2001–2006)
12 September –  Don't Eat the Neighbours on RTÉ Two (2002)
4 October –  Gadget & the Gadgetinis on RTÉ Two (2002–2003)
27 October – You're a Star on RTÉ One (2002–2008)
4 November –  The Fairly OddParents! on RTÉ Two (2001–2017)
Undated –  What's with Andy? on RTÉ Two (2001–2007)
Undated –  The Osbournes on RTÉ Two (2002–2005)
Undated – Any Time Now on RTÉ One (2002)
Undated –  The Invisible Man on RTÉ Two (2000–2002)
Undated - The Education of Max Bickford (2001-2002)

TV3
23 March –  Harold and the Purple Crayon (2001–2002)
11 May –  Phantom Investigators (2002)
Undated –  Futurama (1999–2013)
Undated –  Dan Dare: Pilot of the Future (2001)

TG4
9 January –  Cocco Bill (2001–2004)
4 March –  SpongeBob SquarePants (1999–present)
2 September –  Samurai Jack (2001–2004, 2017)
6 September –  Justice League (2001–2004)
Undated –  The Nightmare Room (2001–2002)
Undated –  Spaced Out (2001–2005)
Undated – Glór Tíre (2002–present)

Changes of network affiliation

Ongoing television programmes

1960s
RTÉ News: Nine O'Clock (1961–present)
RTÉ News: Six One (1962–present)
The Late Late Show (1962–present)

1970s
The Late Late Toy Show (1975–present)
RTÉ News on Two (1978–2014)
The Sunday Game (1979–present)

1980s
Dempsey's Den (1986–2010)
Questions and Answers (1986–2009)
Fair City (1989–present)
RTÉ News: One O'Clock (1989–present)

1990s
Would You Believe (1990s–present)
Winning Streak (1990–present)
Prime Time (1992–present)
No Disco (1993–2003)
Nuacht RTÉ (1995–present)
Fame and Fortune (1996–2006)
Nuacht TG4 (1996–present)
Ros na Rún (1996–present)
A Scare at Bedtime (1997–2006)
The Premiership/Premier Soccer Saturday (1998–2013)
Sports Tonight (1998–2009)
TV3 News (1998–present)
Open House (1999–2004)
Agenda (1999–2004)
The View (1999–2011)
Ireland AM (1999–present)
Telly Bingo (1999–present)

2000s
Nationwide (2000–present)
Bachelors Walk (2001–2003)
TV3 News at 5.30 (2001–present)

Ending this year
29 March – Who Wants to Be a Millionaire? (2000–2002)
Undated – The Weakest Link (2001–2002)

See also
2002 in Ireland

References